Meikleville Hill is a rural locality in the Livingstone Shire, Queensland, Australia.

References 

Shire of Livingstone
Localities in Queensland